Anuragakottaram is a 1998 Indian Malayalam-language comedy film directed by Vinayan and produced by Ramakrishnan under the banner of Prathyusha Films. The film stars Dileep and Suvalakshmi in the lead roles, along with Jagathy Sreekumar, Kalpana, Cochin Haneefa and Maniyanpilla Raju playing supporting roles. The film has musical score by Ilaiyaraaja. However the movie was a commercial success and received positive reviews.

Plot
Charles is a young man who has raised his sister since age 8 after they were orphaned. Due to an incident at her college arts day competition, Charles' sister undergoes a mental shock. To pay for her treatment, he needs a considerable sum of money. He meets Shobharaj, a con man, and together they are hired by Paulochan whose daughter, Anna, recently joined a convent to become a nun. He instructs Charles to romance his daughter in order for her to leave the convent so that his family blood line can continue. Charles and Shobharaj take up jobs at the canteen so they can accomplish this. All goes wrong when Charles mistakenly targets the wrong Anna, also a student at the convent, who falls in love with him and leaves the convent with him.

Once he finds out his mistake, he and Shobharaj spend the rest of the movie 1) lying to the "false" Anna (who Charles is hesitant to tell that his feelings for her were never real), 2) running away from Paulochan who is demanding his 3 lakhs back since they botched the job, 3) from the police, who believe that they kidnapped Anna, 4) thugs hired by Anna's step-brother to kill her because of her large inheritance, and 5) the Mother of the convent Anna ran away from. The 5 forces intersect comically and amidst it all, Charles and (the false) Anna fall in love. All is resolved when Anna's step-brother falls over a ledge, and Charles and Anna are united.

Cast

Soundtrack
The music was composed by Ilayaraja and the lyrics were written by Kaithapram.

References

External links
 

1998 films
1990s Malayalam-language films
Films scored by Ilaiyaraaja
Films directed by Vinayan